"Another Tear Falls" is a song written by Burt Bacharach with lyrics by Hal David which was first a song for the American singer Gene McDaniels in 1962 for the British film It's Trad, Dad! as well as the flip side of his hit single "Chip Chip" and was later recorded and released by the American pop group The Walker Brothers as their seventh UK single in 1966. The accompaniment was directed by Reg Guest.

"Another Tear Falls" was a modest hit spending eight weeks on the UK Singles Chart and peaking at #12 in October. The single was another relative disappointment for the group and confirmed a decline in their commercial fortunes. It was also the group's last single released in their native United States, where it failed to chart. Despite the single's under-performance, Portrait, the group's second album, was released around the same time and was much more popular, making #3 on the UK Albums Chart.

The B-side "Saddest Night in the World" is notable as though it is sung by Scott Walker, is one of John Walker's first compositions. John Walker went on to contribute two songs to the group's following album, both of which he handled lead vocals.

In some territories "Saddest Night in the World" was replaced with "Saturday's Child"; an up-beat album track written by Scott Walker that appeared as the second track on Portrait.

Track listings

Chart positions

References

Songs with lyrics by Hal David
Songs with music by Burt Bacharach
1966 singles
Gene McDaniels songs
The Walker Brothers songs
1962 songs
Philips Records singles
Liberty Records singles
Song recordings produced by Snuff Garrett